Tolna is a town in Tolna County, Hungary.

Twin towns – sister cities

Tolna is twinned with:
 Ozun, Romania
 Palić (Subotica), Serbia
 Stutensee, Germany

References

External links

 in Hungarian

Populated places in Tolna County